The 2022 Mole Valley District Council election took place on 5 May 2022 to elect one-third of members to Mole Valley District Council in England.

Results summary

Ward results

Ashtead Common

Ashtead Park

Ashtead Village

Bookham North

Bookham South

Brockham, Betchworth and Buckland

Capel, Leigh and Newdigate

Dorking North

Dorking South

Fetcham East

Fetcham West

Holmwoods

Leatherhead North

Leatherhead South

References

Mole Valley
Mole Valley District Council elections
May 2022 events in the United Kingdom
2020s in Surrey